Paul Boyd is a Scottish music video, commercial and feature film director.

Biography
Born in Scotland, Boyd graduated from St. Martin's School of Art in London with a BA in Fine Art Film. He currently works and resides in Los Angeles.

Boyd directed and authored Vicious Circle, a feature film starring Paul Rodriguez Jr, Emily Rios, and Trevor Wright, which received the Best Picture Award at the 2008 NYILFF HBO. He has directed advertising campaigns for L'Oreal, Revlon, Jaguar and Dodge.

Videography (highlights)

References

Scottish expatriates in the United States
Living people
Scottish film directors
Year of birth missing (living people)